In linear algebra and the theory of matrices, the Schur complement of a block matrix is defined as follows.

Suppose p, q are nonnegative integers, and suppose A, B, C, D are respectively p × p, p × q, q × p, and q × q matrices of complex numbers. Let

so that M is a (p + q) × (p + q) matrix.

If D is invertible, then the Schur complement of the block D of the matrix M is the p × p matrix defined by

If A is invertible, the Schur complement of the block A of the matrix M is the q × q matrix defined by

In the case that A or D is singular, substituting a generalized inverse for the inverses on M/A and M/D yields the generalized Schur complement.

The Schur complement is named after Issai Schur who used it to prove Schur's lemma, although it had been used previously.  Emilie Virginia Haynsworth was the first to call it the Schur complement. The Schur complement is a key tool in the fields of numerical analysis, statistics, and matrix analysis.

Background
The Schur complement arises when performing a block Gaussian elimination on the matrix M. In order to eliminate the elements below the block diagonal, one multiplies the matrix M by a block lower triangular matrix on the right as follows:

where Ip denotes a p×p identity matrix. As a result, the Schur complement  appears in the upper-left p×p block.

Continuing the elimination process beyond this point (i.e., performing a block Gauss–Jordan elimination),

leads to an LDU decomposition of M, which reads

Thus, the inverse of M may be expressed involving D−1 and the inverse of Schur's complement, assuming it exists, as

The above relationship comes from the elimination operations that involve D−1 and M/D. An equivalent derivation can be done with the roles of A and D interchanged. By equating the expressions for M−1 obtained in these two different ways, one can establish the matrix inversion lemma, which relates the two Schur complements of M: M/D and M/A (see "Derivation from LDU decomposition" in ).

Properties 

 If p and q are both 1 (i.e., A, B, C and D are all scalars), we get the familiar formula for the inverse of a 2-by-2 matrix:
 
 provided that AD − BC is non-zero.
 In general, if A is invertible, then
 
 whenever this inverse exists.
 (Schur's formula) When A, respectively D, is invertible, the determinant of M is also clearly seen to be given by
 , respectively
 ,
 which generalizes the determinant formula for 2 × 2 matrices.
 (Guttman rank additivity formula) If D is invertible, then the rank of M is given by
 
 (Haynsworth inertia additivity formula) If A is invertible, then the inertia of the block matrix M is equal to the inertia of A plus the inertia of M/A.
 (Quotient identity) .
 The Schur complement of a Laplacian matrix is also a Laplacian matrix.

Application to solving linear equations 
The Schur complement arises naturally in solving a system of linear equations such as 

.

Assuming that the submatrix  is invertible, we can eliminate  from the equations, as follows.

.

Substituting this expression into the second equation yields
 .

We refer to this as the reduced equation obtained by eliminating  from the original equation. The matrix appearing in the reduced equation is called the Schur complement of the first block  in :
 .

Solving the reduced equation, we obtain
 .

Substituting this into the first equation yields
 .

We can express the above two equation as:
 .

Therefore, a formulation for the inverse of a block matrix is:
 .

In practice, one needs  to be well-conditioned in order for this algorithm to be numerically accurate.

In electrical engineering this is often referred to as node elimination or Kron reduction.

Applications to probability theory and statistics

Suppose the random column vectors X, Y live in Rn and Rm respectively, and the vector (X, Y) in Rn + m has a multivariate normal distribution whose covariance is the symmetric positive-definite matrix

Then the conditional covariance of X given Y is the Schur complement of C in :

In that case, the Schur complement of C in  also has a Wishart distribution.

Conditions for positive definiteness and semi-definiteness 

Let X be a symmetric matrix of real numbers given by

Then
 If A is invertible, then X is positive definite if and only if A and its complement X/A are both positive definite:
 
 If C is invertible, then X is positive definite if and only if C and its complement X/C are both positive definite:
 
 If A is positive definite, then X is positive semi-definite if and only if the complement X/A is positive semi-definite:
 
 If C is positive definite, then  X is positive semi-definite if and only if the complement X/C is positive semi-definite: 
  

The first and third statements can be derived by considering the minimizer of the quantity

as a function of v (for fixed u).

Furthermore, since

and similarly for positive semi-definite matrices, the second (respectively fourth) statement is immediate from the first (resp. third) statement.

There is also a sufficient and necessary condition for the positive semi-definiteness of X in terms of a generalized Schur complement. Precisely,
  and
 

See also 
 Woodbury matrix identity
 Quasi-Newton method
 Haynsworth inertia additivity formula
 Gaussian process
 Total least squares

References 

Linear algebra